Sabillasville is an unincorporated community and census-designated place in Frederick County, Maryland, United States. As of the 2010 census it had a population of 354.

The Victor Cullen School Power House was listed on the National Register of Historic Places in 1987 and the Victor Cullen Center, Old Administration Building was listed in 1990.

History
The first European settlers to arrive in the vicinity of Sabillasville were Swiss immigrants in the late-1750s. Among the earliest settlers was Peter Zollinger (or Zullinger), who owned the land on which the present-day village is located. In 1813, the village was laid out by Andrew Smith and named Sabillasville in honor of Savilla Zollinger (wife of Peter). In 1872, the Western Maryland Railroad reached Sabillasville on its line leading from Baltimore to Hagerstown and the surrounding area soon developed into a summer resort called Pen Mar (a portmanteau of Pennsylvania and Maryland).

Geography
Route 550 passes through the town, leading northwest  to Blue Ridge Summit, Pennsylvania, and southeast  to Thurmont.

Demographics

References

Census-designated places in Frederick County, Maryland
Census-designated places in Maryland